Oscaecilia equatorialis is a species of caecilian in the family Caeciliidae. It is endemic to Ecuador. Its natural habitats are subtropical or tropical moist lowland forests, plantations, rural gardens, and heavily degraded former forest.

References

Oscaecilia
Amphibians of Ecuador
Endemic fauna of Ecuador
Taxa named by Edward Harrison Taylor
Amphibians described in 1973
Taxonomy articles created by Polbot